The , formerly known as the , is an annual classical music festival held in August and September in Matsumoto, Nagano, Japan, founded in 1992 by conductor Seiji Ozawa.

The festival's resident orchestra is the renowned Saito Kinen Orchestra.

References

External links
Official Website

Music festivals established in 1992
Classical music festivals in Japan
Music festivals in Japan
Classical music in Japan
Tourist attractions in Nagano Prefecture
1992 establishments in Japan